Datana drexelii, or Drexel's datana, is a species of prominent moth in the family Notodontidae. It is found in North America.

The MONA or Hodges number for Datana drexelii is 7904.

References

 Lafontaine, J. Donald & Schmidt, B. Christian (2010). "Annotated check list of the Noctuoidea (Insecta, Lepidoptera) of North America north of Mexico". ZooKeys, vol. 40, 1-239.

Further reading

 

Notodontidae
Moths described in 1884